Pierre Moukoko Mbonjo (born 25 July 1954) is a Cameroonian politician who served in the government of Cameroon as Minister for External Relations from 2011 to 2015.

He was Minister of Communication from 2004 to 2006. He was appointed as Minister of External Affairs on 9 December 2011. After nearly four years as Minister of External Relations, he was dismissed from the government on 2 October 2015.

References 

1954 births
Living people
Government ministers of Cameroon
Foreign ministers of Cameroon
Communication ministers of Cameroon